South American Volleyball Club Championship may refer to
 Men's South American Volleyball Club Championship
 Women's South American Volleyball Club Championship